Paliepiukai ('little place under lime trees', formerly) is a village in Kėdainiai district municipality, in Kaunas County, in central Lithuania. According to the 2011 census, the village had a population of 18 people. There is a large gravel pit. A small cemetery is located in the village.

Formerly it was a place of the Paliepiai manor.

Demography

Images

References

Villages in Kaunas County
Kėdainiai District Municipality